A by-election was held for the New South Wales Legislative Assembly electorate of Cumberland South Riding in November 1856 because the Qualifications Committee declared the August by-election which returned Ryan Brenan was invalid as no poll had been conducted at Canterbury. Brenan was persuaded not to stand to allow Stuart Donaldson to regain a seat, having lost Sydney Hamlets in a ministerial by-election. A committee had been formed to secure the return of Augustus Morris, however it is unclear as to why he was not nominated.

Dates

Result

The Qualifications Committee declared the election of Ryan Brenan was invalid as no poll had been conducted at Canterbury. Brenan was persuaded not to stand to allow Stuart Donaldson to regain a seat, having lost Sydney Hamlets in a ministerial by-election.

See also
Electoral results for the district of Cumberland (South Riding)
List of New South Wales state by-elections

References

1856 elections in Australia
New South Wales state by-elections
1850s in New South Wales